Elmsford is a village in Westchester County, New York, United States. It is part of the New York metropolitan area. Roughly one mile square, the village is fully contained within the borders of the town of Greenburgh. As of the 2010 census, the population of Elmsford was 4,664.

History

Elmsford was largely farmland throughout its early history. The construction of railroads in the late 19th century brought new prominence to the area, and in 1910 it was incorporated as a village.

The area was known from colonial times as "Storm's Bridge" and later, "Hall's Corners", names derived from the principal landowners of the times. In 1870, the growing village was officially renamed "Elmsford" in honor of a local landmark, a giant elm tree (since deceased).  The names Elmsford and Storm's Bridge are reminders of the nearby Saw Mill River, which once had significant tributaries flowing through the village.

A longstanding legend holds that Elmsford is the birthplace of the term "cocktail". According to the tale, a local colonial tavern (sometimes said to be established by town father Isaac Storm) had run out of wooden stirrers during the war and started using the quills of roosters' tailfeathers to stir their drinks; a more embellished version holds that the roosters were plundered from nearby Tory farmers.

Much of Elmsford developed around the New York and Putnam Railroad station, with train service beginning in the 1870s.  Commuter rail service ended in 1958, and freight service ended in 1975.  The railroad bed is now the South County Trailway and North County Trailway.  The train station building is now a restaurant.

The Elmsford Reformed Church and Cemetery was listed on the National Register of Historic Places in 1983.

Geography
Elmsford is located at  (41.053963, -73.815711) in Westchester County, NY.

Government
Elmsford's government comprises a mayor and four trustees. The board and mayor also employ a professional village manager.

Current Mayor: Robert Williams

Fire Department

The Village of Elmsford is protected by the all-volunteer Elmsford Fire Department, which consists of two fire companies each occupying their own firehouses, Live Oak Engine Company, operating two fire engines, and Elmsford Fire Company #1, operating a quint and a tower ladder. Emergency Medical Services are provided by the village-operated Elmsford EMS, which provides BLS services, and the Town of Greenburgh EMS which provides ALS-paramedic service when requested.

Fire station locations and apparatus

Police Department
The Elmsford Police Department, created with the incorporation of the village in 1910, is currently located in the same building as Village Hall, and provides round the clock police protection to the village. It currently employs 22 sworn personnel.

Transportation
The village was once served by the New York and Putnam Railroad. Passenger service ceased in 1958. The Elmsford train station, located on Saw Mill River Road (near the intersection with Route 119) is still standing and now houses a restaurant. The closest Metro-North Railroad stations are Tarrytown (on the Hudson Line) to the west and White Plains (on the Harlem Line) to the east.

Several routes of the Bee-Line Bus System pass through the village.

Features
Elmsford's road system connects to numerous major highways and thoroughfares, including Interstate 287, the Saw Mill River Parkway, the Sprain Brook Parkway and Route 9A; the North County Trailway and South County Trailway bicycle paths terminate there. Convenient to White Plains, Yonkers, New York City, and Connecticut, the village is a significant center of commercial traffic and distribution. It is home to the large Local 456 of the Teamsters union.

The village's public schools are run by the Elmsford Board of Education and include Dixson Primary, Alice E. Grady Elementary and Alexander Hamilton Junior/Senior High School. The village is also home to the private Roman Catholic elementary school Our Lady of Mount Carmel, which is affiliated with the Catholic parish of the same name and which was established in 1929.

Dedicated in 1996, Carol Nichols Park has facilities for softball, basketball, tennis as well as a gated "kiddie park" and Sprinkler Park (attendant) for small children.

The town has had an animal shelter since the 1930s. In 1995 the shelter, Central Westchester Humane Society, moved to a location on Warehouse Lane South. The shelter was replaced by Pets Alive Westchester, and later Paws Crossed Animal Rescue, the current owner.

The Westchester Broadway Theater was a professional dinner theater venue established in Elmsford in 1974. The theater closed permanently in October 2020 due to financial hardships caused by the ongoing COVID-19 Pandemic.

Demographics

As of the census of 2010, there were 4,664 people, 1,618 households, and 1,101 families residing in the village. The population density was 4,306 people per square mile (1,641.3/km2). There were 1,618 housing units at an average density of 1,585.9 per square mile (610.0/km2).

There were 1,618 households, out of which 32.0% had children under the age of 18 living with them, 47.5% were married couples living together, 13.2% had a female householder with no husband present, and 32.0% were non-families. 25.5% of all households were made up of individuals, and 6.8% had someone living alone who was 65 years of age or older. The average household size was 2.88 and the average family size was 3.39.

The village population was spread out, with 22.1% under the age of 18, 12.8% from 18 to 24, 33.5% from 25 to 44, 24.4% from 45 to 64, and 10.8% who were 65 years of age or older. The median age was 35.1 years. Males make up 50.9% of the population while women make up 49.1% of the population 

The racial makeup of the village was 46.4%% White, 20.5% African American, 0.6% Native American, 10.5% Asian, 0% Pacific Islander, 18.0% from other races, and 4.1% from two or more races. Hispanic or Latino of any race were 38.0% of the population.

The median income for a household in the village was $74,069, and the median income for a family was $84,698. Males had a median income of $43,649 versus $41,356 for females. The per capita income for the village was $32,448. About 8.58% of families and 10.86% of the population were below the poverty line.

Notable people
 Isaac Van Wart (1762–1828), Revolutionary War hero
  The Turnesa brothers: Joe (1901-1991), Mike (1907-2000), Doug (1909-1972), Jim (1912-1971), and Willie Turnesa (1914-2001), professional and amateur golfers
 Giancarlo Esposito (b. 1958), actor
 Donovan Mitchell (b. 1996), professional basketball player

Popular culture
 A scene in the movie Freedomland (2006) was shot at the Red Fox Diner on Rte. 9A in Elmsford.
 A scene in the movie 8mm (1999) was shot outside the Elmsford Motel on Rte. 119.
 A scene in the movie Disconnect (2012) was shot at the Saw Mill River Motel next to the Saw Mill River Parkway.

References

External links

History of Elmsford

Greenburgh, New York
Villages in Westchester County, New York
1910 establishments in New York (state)
Populated places established in 1910